This is a list of places named for Richard Montgomery, a major general of the Continental Army killed in the 1775 Battle of Quebec.

Cities:
Montgomery, Alabama (The city was named for Richard Montgomery, but Montgomery County, Alabama, in which it is located, was named for Major Lemuel P. Montgomery.)
Montgomery, Massachusetts
Montgomery, Minnesota
Montgomery Twp, New Jersey
Montgomery, Vermont
Town of Montgomery, Orange County, NY
Village of Montgomery, Orange County, NY
Montgomery, Illinois (Note: This community was actually named in honor of Montgomery County, New York from which its original settlers emigrated.  Montgomery County, New York was named after Richard Montgomery)
Counties:
Montgomery County, Arkansas
Montgomery County, Georgia
Montgomery County, Illinois
Montgomery County, Indiana
Montgomery County, Iowa
Montgomery County, Kansas
Montgomery County, Kentucky
Montgomery County, Maryland
Montgomery County, Mississippi (there is some question as to whether this county was named for Richard Montgomery. There are two origins given in sources.)
Montgomery County, Missouri
Montgomery County, New York
Montgomery County, North Carolina
Montgomery County, Ohio
Montgomery County, Pennsylvania (there is some question as to whether this county was named for Richard Montgomery.)
Montgomery County, Virginia
High Schools:
 Richard Montgomery High School, Rockville, Maryland

There was also a ship, the SS Richard Montgomery, the wreck of which remains a potential hazard due to unexploded ordnance.

Montgomery, Richard place names
Montgomery